Swing Kids is a 1993 American drama film directed by Thomas Carter and starring Christian Bale, Robert Sean Leonard and Frank Whaley. In pre-World War II Germany, two high school students attempt to be swing kids by night and Hitler Youth by day, a decision that acutely impacts their friends and families.

Historical background
In the 1930s, some young German teens favored American and British pop culture; they hung out in secret underground clubs where bands played swing music and listened to contemporary music by acts like Benny Goodman and Duke Ellington. The film's screenwriter, Jonathan Marc Feldman, based the film on this eponymous Swing Kids (Swingjugend) movement.

Plot
In Hamburg in 1939, Peter Müller and Thomas Berger join their friends Arvid and Otto at a swing club called the Bismarck. They have a good time, dancing and enjoying the music.

Peter goes home to find his mother in an argument with the Nazi Blockleiter (block leader). Herr Knopp, head of the local Gestapo, arrives and curtly dismisses the Blockleiter.  Herr Knopp begins asking Frau Müller questions about some of her late husband's friends. Herr Müller had been accused of being a communist, and his health was irreparably damaged by an interrogation at the hands of Nazi agents.

At Arvid's house, Thomas accidentally ruins one of Arvid's prized records. Upset, Arvid kicks Thomas, Peter and Otto out. To apologize to Arvid, Peter and Thomas steal a radio (which Peter knows was stolen from a ransacked Jewish home) from a bakery. Thomas escapes, but Peter is caught. Herr Knopp, who is attracted to Peter's mother, intercedes for him; in return, Peter must enroll in the Hitlerjugend (Hitler Youth).

Peter, who has a job delivering books, is asked to spy on his boss, whom the Nazis suspect is working against the Reich. In HJ school, the boys are encouraged to spy on their friends and families. Thomas accuses his father of insulting Hitler, hoping to cause trouble for him, but is unnerved when the Nazis come to his home and take his father away. His subsequent attempts to resume his friendship with Peter and persuade him to collaborate with the Nazis are tinged with fear.

Arvid, who is working at a jazz club, refuses to play a German song, lashing out at the club's patrons for being blind to the Nazi agenda. Peter is sympathetic but Thomas loudly argues the Nazi side. Peter angrily proclaims Thomas to be a "fucking Nazi" and storms off. After he is badly beaten by Nazis, leaving him struggling to play the guitar, Arvid realizes there is nothing for him in Germany and dies by suicide.

As Thomas begins to believe fully in Nazi ideology, Peter feels as though there is no hope for him. Peter, disenchanted with how his life is coming apart, dresses up and goes to a swing club which is scheduled to be raided by members of the Hitlerjugend. As Thomas begins assaulting the club's patrons he attacks Peter; however, during the fight Peter is able to reach Thomas. Thomas begs Peter to run away but Peter won't. Willie Müller is there and as Peter is driven away by the police, he loudly screams "Swing Heil!" over and over again, proud that his brother stood up for being a swing kid.

Cast
 Robert Sean Leonard as Peter Müller
 Christian Bale as Thomas Berger
 Frank Whaley as Arvid
 Barbara Hershey as Frau Müller
 Tushka Bergen as Evey
 David Tom as Willi Müller
 Julia Stemberger as Frau Linge
 Kenneth Branagh as SS-Sturmbannführer Knopp
 Noah Wyle as Emil Lutz
 Jessica Hynes as Helga
 Martin Clunes as Bannführer
 Jayce Bartok as Otto

Reception
Rotten Tomatoes gives it a score of 56% (based on 18 reviews) and an average score of 4.93/10. Jonathan Rosenbaum of Chicago Reader described the film as a "corny but sincere weeper", and Roger Ebert of the Chicago Sun-Times gave the film one star (out of 4) and criticized the screenplay (calling it "murky" and including it on his "Most Hated" list). On Metacritic, which assigns a weighted mean rating out of 100 reviews from film critics, the film has a rating score of 39 (based on 20 reviews). The Tech called it "amazing", writing that the "well-researched film is wonderfully acted".

A contemporary film reviewer wrote:
In the eyes of today's teenagers, Nazis are simplistic villains who get outsmarted, out-gunned and outmaneuvered by Indiana Jones in Raiders of the Lost Ark and other simplistic action-adventure tales. For that uninformed youth audience, Swing Kids is a grim history lesson on the horrors the Nazis inflicted on fellow Germans during Adolf Hitler's move toward World War in 1939.

Soundtrack

The soundtrack includes a combination of swing music and the film's score.

 "Sing, Sing, Sing (With a Swing)" – 5:05
 "Nothing to Report" – 1:37
 "Shout and Feel It" – 2:27
 "It Don't Mean a Thing (If It Ain't Got That Swing)" – 2:51
 "The Letter" – 4:12
 "Flat Foot Floogee" – 3:20
 "Arvid Beaten" – 2:12
 "Swingtime in the Rockies" – 3:10
 "Daphne" – 1:52
 "Training for Utopia" – 3:45
 "Life Goes to a Party/Jumpin' at the Woodside" – 2:17
 "Goodnight, My Love" – 3:08
 "Ashes" – 4:21
 "Bei Mir Bist Du Schön" – 4:11
 "The Bismarck" – 3:06
 "Swing Heil″ – 5:28

References

External links

 
 

1993 films
1993 drama films
American dance films
Hitler Youth
Hollywood Pictures films
Jazz films
Films about the German Resistance
Films set in Hamburg
Films set in 1939
Films shot in the Czech Republic
Films scored by James Horner
Holocaust films
1993 directorial debut films
Films directed by Thomas Carter (director)
1990s English-language films
1990s American films